Mmoloki Nogeng (born May 30, 1982) is a boxer from Botswana. Nogeng won a bronze medal at the 2006 Commonwealth Games in Melbourne, Australia, losing to Bruno Julie in the semi-finals of the bantamweight (54 kg) category.

Sources
 Statistics at official 2006 Commonwealth Games website

1982 births
Living people
Bantamweight boxers
Botswana male boxers
Boxers at the 2006 Commonwealth Games
Commonwealth Games bronze medallists for Botswana
Commonwealth Games medallists in boxing
African Games medalists in boxing
African Games silver medalists for Botswana
Competitors at the 2011 All-Africa Games
Medallists at the 2006 Commonwealth Games